Hôtel de Conti can refer to:
 Hôtel de Conti, the name of the Hôtel du Plessis-Guénégaud on the Quai Malaquais in Paris from 1660 to 1670
 Hôtel de Conti or Grand Hôtel de Conti, the names of the Hôtel de Nevers (left bank) in Paris from 1670 to about 1749
 Hôtel de Conti, the name of the Hôtel de Brienne on the rue Saint-Dominique in Paris from 1733 to 1776